The Schlow Centre Region Library, formerly known as the State College Public Library and the Schlow Memorial Library, serves the State College, Pennsylvania area.

History
The library was named after local businessman Charles Schlow, who in 1957 donated space in a West College Avenue house for the original library.  The library quickly grew and moved to a new location on South Allen Street.

A new building opened in 2005, replacing the original.  The new two-story  building cost $10 million to construct. The public facilities include 66 computers. There were over 37,000 card holders when the new library opened in 2005.  According to the 2005 Annual Report, Schlow had more than 291,000 visitors and 592,000 books in circulation.

Schlow Centre Region Library is part of the Central PA Library District, allowing patrons to use interlibrary loan to check out material from other public libraries in Centre, Clearfield, Juniata, and Mifflin Counties.

References

External links
 Official Website

State College, Pennsylvania
Libraries in Pennsylvania
Public libraries in Pennsylvania
Buildings and structures in Centre County, Pennsylvania
Library buildings completed in 1957
Library buildings completed in 2005